Bong-1 is an electoral district for the elections to the House of Representatives of Liberia. The constituency covers Kpaai District, Boinsen District, Tukpahblee District and Kokoyah District.

Elected representatives

References

Electoral districts in Liberia